Harel (lit. Mountain of God) is a kibbutz in central Israel. Located near Latrun with an area of 12,000 dunams, it falls under the jurisdiction of Mateh Yehuda Regional Council.

History
Kibbutz Harel established on 28 October 1948  on the land of the depopulated Palestinian village of Bayt Jiz. It was named for the Harel Brigade of the Palmach, which its founders had been members of and the building from which Yitzhak Rabin commanded the Harel Brigade is located on the grounds of the kibbutz. Most of the founders were Sabras, although some were new immigrants from Hungary and Poland.

A pre-Roman wine press was discovered in the kibbutz vineyards.

Clos de Gat winery, established in 1998, produces around 90,000 bottles annually. The grapes come from 130 dunams of vineyards on the outskirts of the kibbutz.

Gallery

References

External links

Official website

Kibbutzim
Kibbutz Movement
Populated places established in 1948
Populated places in Jerusalem District
1948 establishments in Israel